Edna Anhalt (born Edna Thompson) was an American screenwriter, television writer, and film producer. Together with then-husband Edward Anhalt, she enjoyed some considerable success in a 10-year stretch from 1947 to her retirement in 1957. This stretch was capped with an Academy Award for Best Story win for Elia Kazan's 1950 film Panic in the Streets, and another nomination two years later for The Sniper. She also wrote the screenplays to The Member of the Wedding (1952), Not as a Stranger (1955) and The Pride and the Passion (1957), before hanging up her pen after her divorce.

Full filmography

References

1914 births
1987 deaths
American women screenwriters
Best Story Academy Award winners
20th-century American women writers
20th-century American screenwriters